Sofya Goslavskaya (1890—1979) was a Russian theater and film actress.

Selected filmography 
 1913 — The Accession of the House of Romanovs
 1913 — The Little House in Kolomna
 1914 — Ruslan and Ludmila
 1914 — Volga and Siberia
 1914 — Chrysanthemums (film)

References

External links 
 Софья Гославская on kino-teatr.ru

Russian film actresses
1890 births
1979 deaths